Bluestone State Park is a state park in Summers County, West Virginia.  The  park is located along the western shore of Bluestone Lake, an impoundment of the New River built and managed by the U.S. Army Corps of Engineers. The park and lake are named after the Bluestone River, that flows into the New River at the park.

Features

 26 cabins
 Campground with 77 campsites (22 with electrical hookup)
 Boating access
 Marina with boat and canoe rental
 Swimming pool
 Picnic area

See also

List of West Virginia state parks
Bluestone Wildlife Management Area

References

External links
 

State parks of West Virginia
Protected areas of Summers County, West Virginia
Protected areas established in 1950
Campgrounds in West Virginia
1950 establishments in West Virginia
IUCN Category III